Zynga Dallas (formerly Bonfire Studios) was a video game development company based in Dallas, Texas. After Ensemble Studios was shut down by Microsoft in 2009, Bonfire Studios was one of four companies founded by former Ensemble employees. Bonfire's co-founders were Bill Jackson, David Rippy, Scott Winsett, and Stephen Rippy.

In late July 2010, the team released We Farm for iOS. On October 5, 2010, Bonfire Studios was acquired by Zynga and renamed Zynga Dallas.  Their first project was CastleVille, released in 2011.

The studio was shuttered as part of mass worldwide layoffs by their parent company in 2013.

Immediately following the closure of Zynga Dallas, Boss Fight Entertainment  was founded by former employees of it in June 2013.

References

Zynga
Companies based in Dallas
Video game companies established in 2009
Video game companies disestablished in 2013
Defunct video game companies of the United States
Video game companies based in Texas
Video game development companies
Defunct companies based in Texas